Eugene Yon Chung (born June 14, 1969) is a former American football offensive tackle who played in the National Football League from 1992 to 1997. He is also a former American football coach.

Professional playing career
The New England Patriots drafted Chung in the first round with the 13th overall selection out of Virginia Tech in the 1992 NFL draft. Chung was the first Korean American to be drafted in the first round of an NFL Draft. He played three seasons with New England. In 1992, Chung played in 15 games, starting 14, and was named to the NFL's All-Rookie Team.  The following season, he started all 16 games in Bill Parcells’ first year as Patriots coach.  That season, Chung helped paved the way for Leonard Russell to rush for over 1,000 yards.

Chung was selected by the Jacksonville Jaguars in the 1995 NFL Expansion Draft. He played one season with the Jaguars and one with the Indianapolis Colts before retiring.

Chung was elected to the Virginia Tech Sports Hall of Fame in 2008.

Professional coaching career
Chung was the assistant offensive line coach for the Kansas City Chiefs from 2013 to 2015 under head coach Andy Reid, after serving three seasons with him in Philadelphia Eagles in the same capacity. Chung was re-hired by the Eagles on January 20, 2016, by new head coach Doug Pederson, who was Chung's offensive coordinator with the Chiefs. As a coach, Chung won Super Bowl LII with the Eagles when they defeated the New England Patriots 41–33.

Personal life
Chung is of Korean descent. Chung's son, Kyle, followed in his footsteps as an offensive lineman at Virginia Tech.

References

1969 births
American football offensive tackles
American sportspeople of Korean descent
Indianapolis Colts players
Jacksonville Jaguars players
Kansas City Chiefs coaches
Living people
New England Patriots players
Oakton High School alumni
People from Prince George's County, Maryland
Philadelphia Eagles coaches
Players of American football from Maryland
Sportspeople from Fairfax County, Virginia
Sportspeople from the Washington metropolitan area
Virginia Tech Hokies football players